The fourth season of the action-adventure television series The A-Team premiered in the United States on NBC on September 24, 1985, and concluded on May 13, 1986, consisting of 23 episodes.

Cast
 George Peppard as Lieutenant Colonel/Colonel John "Hannibal" Smith
 Dirk Benedict as First Lieutenant Templeton "Faceman" Peck
 Dwight Schultz as Captain H. M. Murdock
 Mr. T as Sergeant First Class Bosco Albert "B. A." (Bad Attitude) Baracus

Episodes

References

The A-Team seasons
1985 American television seasons
1986 American television seasons